Analytic apriori may refer to:

A priori and a posteriori
Analytic–synthetic distinction
Analytic truth